Lake Asal can refer to
Lake Asal (Djibouti), the lowest point in Africa
Lake Karum in Ethiopia, also known as Lake Assal